Flying Copper is a portrait of a British policeman by British artist, Banksy. The portrait is of a winged and heavily armed policeman with a yellow smiley replacing his face.

The piece was first shown on cardboard that was suspended from the ceiling at the Turf War exhibition in the East End of London in 2003. Screenprints were released in 2003 with two different background colours; blue and pink.

References

Works by Banksy
2003 paintings
Portraits by English artists
Works about police officers